Jānis Straupe (born June 3, 1989) is a Latvian ice hockey player who currently plays for HK Kurbads of Latvian Hockey League.

Straupe has also played several games for Dinamo Riga of the Kontinental Hockey League.

References

External links

1989 births
Living people
Ice hockey people from Riga
Latvian ice hockey forwards
Dinamo Riga players
HK Liepājas Metalurgs players
Tønsberg Vikings players
Latvian expatriate ice hockey people
Latvian expatriate sportspeople in Norway
Expatriate ice hockey players in Norway
Expatriate ice hockey players in Ukraine
Expatriate ice hockey players in Finland
Latvian expatriate sportspeople in Finland
Latvian expatriate sportspeople in Ukraine